Jiří Veselý was the defending champion, but he was ineligible to compete this year. World number one, Luke Saville of Australia led the field. The Aussie junior tennis player headed up the top ten seeds which included Thiago Monteiro, 2011 Wimbledon junior finalist Liam Broady, Kaichi Uchida, Frederico Ferreira Silva, Andrew Harris, Kyle Edmund, Stefano Napolitano, Nikola Milojević and Adam Pavlásek.

The start of the 2012 Australian Open saw all the seeds apart from Monteiro, Cagnina and Farren made it to the second round. The biggest upset of the first round was Brazilian Thiago Monteiro losing to Australian wild card Jack Schipanski. Julien Cagnina lost to French Mathias Bourgue and American Connor Farren went to French Laurent Lokoli. The second round witnessed all the seeds go through except Broady lost to Robin Staněk, Napolitano to Joshua Ward-Hibbert and Kyrgios to Marek Routa. The third round is also where the seeds meet for the first time. Kimmer Coppejans and Hossam exited to higher seeds. Seventh seeded Edmund defeated eleventh seeded Coppejans and No. 1 seeded Saville defeated sixteenth seeded Hossam. The biggest upset of the third round was tenth seeded Pavlásek defeating fifth seeded Silva and sixth seeded Harris losing to American qualifier Mackenzie McDonald. Milojevic lost to Joshua Ward-Hibbert and Pöllänen to Staněk. The quarter finals saw Saville end Edmund's run and Pavlásek end Uchida's run successfully making their way into the semifinals. The semifinals witnessed Saville taking out Pavlásek while Filip Peliwo overcame McDonald. In the final, Luke Saville defeated Filip Peliwo to claim his first Junior Boys' Singles Australian Open title and second grand slam title of his career.

Seeds

Draw

Finals

Top half

Section 1

Section 2

Bottom half

Section 3

Section 4

References
 Main Draw
 Qualifying Draw

Boys' Singles
Australian Open, 2012 Boys' Singles